Trop Jr is a short film festival featuring films produced by Australians aged 15 years and younger. Trop Jr has been part of the Tropfest film festival since 2008 and is held in Sydney, Australia each year. Trop Jr is billed as "The Worlds Largest Short Film Festival for Kids! By Kids!".

Each year, Trop Jr has a theme of a "signature item", an item or action being incorporated in the entry films to ensure that they are unique and are made specifically for Trop Jr. The films must be seven minutes or less. The prize includes a digital camera, an ABC3 educational filmmaking experience and film and television short courses.

History
Trop Jr has been included as part of the Tropfest program since 2008, when 8 films were entered into competition. It had been planned for three years, and has support from the Australian Children's Television Foundation, Boomerang and the Cartoon Network.

One of the judges in 2009, when 12 films were screened, was child actor Brandon Walters. Around 150 films were entered in 2010, of which 14 were finalists including two separate films by a brother and sister; the elder brother won. The 2008 runner-up also made the finals in 2009. The 2011 winner, "Imagine", was inspired by Inception, and was made on a camera phone for A$70 over three days.

References

External links
 Official Trop Jr Site
 Official Tropfest Site
 Finalists on YouTube: 2008 winner, 2009, 2010, 2011

Children's film festivals
Film festivals in Sydney
Short film festivals in Australia
Tropfest
Film festivals established in 2008